Saccharophagos is a monotypic moth genus of the family Erebidae. Its only species, Saccharophagos mochisa, is found in Mexico. Both the genus and species were first described by William Schaus in 1923.

References

Calpinae
Monotypic moth genera